Marc Lamborelle (born 13 October 1971) is a retired Luxembourgian football midfielder.

References

1971 births
Living people
Luxembourgian footballers
Jeunesse Esch players
Association football midfielders
Luxembourg international footballers